Fujin Road is a station and the northern terminus of the Shanghai Metro Line 1. It is located at the intersection of Wenchuan Highway and Yangzong Road in Baoshan District.

The station has 3 tracks, one island platform, and one side platform. Only the outer island platform and the side platform are in use, with the side platform used for terminating Line 1 trains and the outer island platform for originating trains towards Xinzhuang.

Exit list

References 

Line 1, Shanghai Metro
Shanghai Metro stations in Baoshan District
Railway stations in China opened in 2007
Railway stations in Shanghai